Prospect Harbor is a bay in Gouldsboro, Maine. It is separated from Gouldsboro Bay to the northeast by Cranberry Point and from Winter Harbor to the west by the Schoodic Peninsula.

The bay is roughly 3 mi. (5 km) long and 3 mi. across (5 km) at its widest.

References

External links
  Maine Coast Guides: Prospect Harbor

Bays of Maine
Bodies of water of Hancock County, Maine